Danielle Nicole Bisutti (born October 1, 1976) is an American actress and singer. She is best known for her roles as Amanda Cantwell on the Nickelodeon television series True Jackson, VP and the Norse goddess Freya in the 2018 video game, God of War, for which she received a British Academy Games Award for Performer nomination, and its 2022 sequel, God of War Ragnarök, for which she was nominated for the British Academy Games Award for Performer in a Supporting Role.

Early life
Bisutti was born and raised in Los Angeles, California, the daughter of Diana (née Ferrare) and Richard Bisutti. Her father was a set decorator in both film and television for 20 years. Her maternal aunt is model Cristina Ferrare. Bisutti is of Italian descent. Bisutti attended California State University, Fullerton, where she received a BA in Acting and Musical Theatre.

Acting career 
While attending university, Bisutti was nominated several times for Best Actress in the Irene Ryan Competition and took the runner-up position at The Lincoln Center Theatre in New York City. Michael Butler noticed Bisutti in the role of Sheila in a California production of Hair and brought the cast to Chicago to perform at the Democratic National Convention along with a five-week run at The New Athenaeum Theatre. Bisutti's other theatre credits include Reno Sweeney in Anything Goes, Maggie in Boy's Life, Yelena in Uncle Vanya, Victoria/Jane in Noël Coward’s Tonight at 8.30, Fastrada in Pippin, and Ophelia in Hamlet.

Bisutti has performed in television over the years, recurring on Last Man Standing, Parks & Recreation, CSI: Miami, Without a Trace, Raising the Bar and The O.C., while also appearing on NCIS, Criminal Minds, Castle, Hot in Cleveland, 90210, Private Practice, Body of Proof, Bones, Cold Case, Two and a Half Men and Boston Legal. She may best known for her starring role as Amanda Cantwell opposite Keke Palmer on the Nickelodeon series True Jackson, VP from 2008 to 2011.

Some of her film credits include Venice Underground, The Neighbor, and No Greater Love. Bisutti co-produced the webseries Hollywood Girl and recurred on the series as Pasha Maneer. She had a leading role in Harland Williams's post-apocalyptic sci-fi webseries The Australian, which was released in late November 2013.

In 2018, Bisutti provided the voice and motion capture for the Witch of the Woods, who is later revealed to be the goddess Freya, in God of War. She received praise for her work and was nominated for the BAFTA Award for Best Performance in a Video Game at the 15th British Academy Games Awards but lost to her co-star Jeremy Davies.

Singing career 
Songs originally written by Bisutti, such as "Venice Underground", "April Moon", and "In the Presence of", have been used in independent feature films. At the 2003 Los Angeles Music Awards, she won the award for "Best Female Singer-Songwriter". Also at this ceremony, her song "Glimmer" was nominated for "AAA Album of the Year," and her song "In Passing" received the Unanimous Choice Recipient Award for "Independent AC Single of the Year". In September 2004, Bisutti performed at the Temecula Valley International Film & Music Festival, where "In Passing" was selected for the TVIFF's "Top Musical Artist Compilation CD" and Music Connection Magazine featured Bisutti in its 2004 "Hot 100 Unsigned Artists" list.

Filmography

Film

Television

Video games

References

External links
 

1976 births
Actresses from Los Angeles
American women singer-songwriters
American film actresses
American musical theatre actresses
American television actresses
American video game actresses
American voice actresses
California State University, Fullerton alumni
Living people
Musicians from Los Angeles
Singer-songwriters from California
21st-century American women singers
21st-century American actresses